Acacius is a masculine given name which may refer to:

Saints
 Acathius of Melitene (died c. 251), Bishop of Melitene, venerated by the Eastern Orthodox Church
 Agathius, also known as Acacius of Byzantium (died 303), martyred Cappadocian Greek centurion of the imperial army
 An early Church of St Acacius existed at Constantinople, possibly connected with this martyr.
 Acacius of Sebaste (died c. 304), Armenian priest
 Acacius (died 320), Roman soldier and one of the Forty Martyrs of Sebaste
 Acacius of Amida, Bishop of Amida, Mesopotamia (400–425)
 Acacius of Constantinople (died 489), Ecumenical Patriarch of Constantinople, Oriental Orthodox saint engaged in the Christological controversy
 Saint Acacius, leader of the Ten thousand martyrs (Roman soldiers who converted to Christianity and were crucified in Armenia), according to medieval legend
 Acacius the Younger (died 1730), Greek Orthodox monk who lived on Mount Athos

Other uses
 Acacius the grammarian from Caesarea; friend of Libanius (314–394)
 Acacius of Caesarea (d. 366), aka "the One-Eyed", bishop in Caesarea, opponent of St. Cyril of Jerusalem
 Acacius of Beroea (d. 437), Syrian bishop
 Acacius of Seleucia-Ctesiphon (d. 496), Patriarch of the Church of the East
 Acacius, father of Theodora (6th century) (500–548), empress of the Byzantine Empire
Acacius (proconsul), Byzantine proconsul of Armenia Prima (First Armenia), c. 536-539
Acacius (Alexandria), Byzantine military officer in Alexandria, c. 539-540
Acacius (curator), Byzantine imperial curator in the 560s
Acacius (son of Archelaus), Byzantine imperial representative, active c. 573

See also
 Acacia (disambiguation)

Masculine given names